Westminster College was a teacher training college and college of higher education in England. The college was founded in London in 1851 as a training institute for teachers for Wesleyan Methodist schools, but moved to Oxford in 1959. Before the move, it was part of the London Institute for Education. From 1959 to 1981, its qualifications were awarded by Oxford University. From 1981 to 1992, its qualifications were awarded by the CNAA. After 1992, its courses were validated by Oxford University again. In 2000, financial pressures caused the college to close. The Methodist Church subsequently leased the college's site at Harcourt Hill to Oxford Brookes University and it became the home of that university's Westminster Institute of Education.

Westminster 1851–1959 
John Wesley was convinced of the importance of education and, following the advice of his friend Philip Doddridge, opened schools at The Foundery in London, and at Newcastle and Kingswood. With the extension of franchise in 1832, both Church and Government recognised the need for education for the masses. The Methodist Conference commissioned William Atherton, Richard Treffry and Samuel Jackson to report on Wesleyan Methodist (as distinct from Primitive Methodist) schools, coming to the conclusion that if the Church were to prosper the system of Sunday schools (3,339 in number at that time, with 59,277 teachers and 341,442 pupils) must be augmented by day-schools with teachers educated to high school level. The Rev. John Scott (1792–1868), was grandfather of John Scott Lidgett, proposed in 1843 that 700 new Methodist day-schools be established within seven years. Though a steady increase was achieved, that ambitious target could not be reached, in part limited by the number of suitably qualified teachers, mostly Sunday-school teachers sent at considerable cost to David Stow's Free Church Normal Seminary in Glasgow. The outcome of the Wesleyan Education Report for 1844 was the foundation in 1851 of Westminster Training College at Horseferry Road, Westminster, London, with John Scott its first principal.

It remained the primary source of Wesleyan Methodist teachers worldwide until the Methodist Union of 1932.

Its neo-Gothic buildings were requisitioned during the First World War, and used as a station for Australian servicemen.

The site was severely damaged by an incendiary bomb on 4 March 1944 during the blitz in the Second World War, and the buildings were never repaired. They were demolished in the 1960s and the headquarters of the television station Channel 4 now stand on the site.

Oxford 1959–2000 

In 1959, Westminster College moved into a set of purpose-built facilities on Harcourt Hill, Oxford, with buildings designed by Seely & Paget which were noted for their fusion of Oxford quads with a "New England" style of architecture, evident particularly in the large and distinctive chapel.

Following the move, the college's qualifications were validated by the University of Oxford through its Institute of Education and, later, its Department of Education. The qualifications included a Certificate in Education, the Bachelor of Education degree, a postgraduate certificate in education, and some supplementary certificates. Oxford University ended this arrangement in 1981. The college's qualifications were then validated by the Council for National Academic Awards (CNAA) until 1992, when the CNAA ceased to exist. The college then entered into a new arrangement with Oxford University from 1993. Oxford University validated a number of qualifications at the college from this date, including degrees in education and theology.

Westminster College was an "approved society" of the University of Oxford. Those who read for its degrees were entitled to become members of Oxford University Student Union and life members of the Oxford Union, and to attend all lectures at the university. Students received notification of their degree results from the university, not the college, and all examination papers and dissertations were marked by the university. Degree certificates were those of the University of Oxford in toto, and included the coats of arms of both Westminster College and the University of Oxford. Graduation ceremonies were presided over by the vice-chancellor in the Sheldonian Theatre according to the usual form, with slight modifications to allow for the fact that students had not matriculated. (To matriculate is to go through the matriculation ceremony which makes one a member of the university, so students at Westminster College did not have this status in Oxford). Thus, they are nonetheless Oxford graduates, though not Oxford BAs.

In 2000, financial pressures prompted the Methodist Church to cease operating Westminster College, although its students were permitted to continue studying for their degrees through the University of Oxford.  A deal was struck to lease the Harcourt Hill site to Oxford Brookes University and the college buildings became the Westminster Institute of Education, a school of Oxford Brookes University, thus continuing the use of the Westminster name. In addition to housing the Westminster Institute of Education, other subjects such as theology, philosophy, and media and communication are also taught at what is now Oxford Brookes University's Harcourt Hill campus. Courses begun before 2000 continued to be validated by Oxford University, including classes taken by international students, during the transition period until students who had begun at Westminster College, rather than Brookes, had graduated. Westminster Institute was eventually absorbed into Oxford Brookes University.

Staff 
Principals

1851–1868: John Scott 
1868–1903: J. H. Rigg 
1903–1930: H. B. Workman 
1930–1940: A. W. Harrison 
1940–1953: J. S. Ross 
1953–1969: H. Trevor Hughes 
1969–1981: Donald Crompton 
1981–1996: Kenneth Wilson 
1996–2000: Richard Ralph 

Vice-Principals

1851–1881: William Sugden 
1881–1888: Charles Mansford 
1888–1904: H. A. Reatchlous 
1904–1918: A. D. G. Barriball 
1918–1921: Egbert H. Magson 
1921–1930: A. W. Harrison 
1930–1940: J. S. Ross 
1946–1953: H. Trevor Hughes 
1953–1961: T.B. Shepherd 
1961–1967: J.G. Harrison 
1967–1969: Chris Eddy 
1969–1981: Donald Tranter 
1981-1989: Stephen Phillipson 
1989-????: Harry Fearon

Notable alumni

 James Yoxall, Educationalist and Politician
 Jonathan Gough, Anglican military chaplain and archdeacon
 Christine Hardman, Anglican Bishop
 Janet Mackenzie, Anglican archdeacon 
 John Willman, journalist and political activist

Further reading 
 Jennifer Bone, Our Calling to Fulfil: Westminster College and the Changing Face of Teacher Education 1951–2001, Tockington Press, 2003
F. C. Pritchard, The Story of Westminster College 1851–1951, Epworth Press, 1951

Arms

References

External links 
 Oxford Brookes University — history
  Westminster College London & Oxford Alumni website — memories, photos, etc.

Educational institutions established in 1851
Higher education colleges in England
Buildings and structures in Oxford
Education in Oxford
Oxford Brookes University
1851 establishments in England
Teacher training colleges in the United Kingdom
Methodist universities and colleges